Arcachon station (French: Gare d'Arcachon) is a railway station located in Arcachon, Gironde, south-western France. The station is located on the Lamothe–Arcachon railway. The train services are operated by SNCF.

Train services

High speed services (TGV) Paris - Bordeaux - Arcachon
Local services (TER Nouvelle-Aquitaine) Arcachon - Facture-Biganos - Bordeaux

References

Railway stations in Gironde